Faeryville is a 2015 Singapore coming-of-age dystopian film written and directed by cult director Tzang Merwyn Tong. This independent film stars Lyon Sim, Aaron Samuel Yong, Tanya Graham and Kris Moller. Faeryville tells the story of a group of college misfits who decide to fight their bullies, escalating from youthful idealism to all-out anarchy. Faeryville is Singapore's first dystopian youth film.

The film made its world premiere to rousing reception in Los Angeles, California, represented by US distributor Eleven Arts, followed by a limited theatrical release in Singapore. It was the Closing Night Film of the Brisbane Festival 2015  and won the Award for Best Original Story at the FLIXX Festival, in Scott Valley, United States.

Plot 
Set in an alternate universe, in a college called Faeryville, a group of teenage misfits struggle to find themselves and make sense of their ‘teenhood’. They decide that there is no reason to try to fit in, and fashion themselves as pranksters, calling themselves The Nobodies. Laer, a new transfer student who joins The Nobodies, inspires them to move from stink bombs to homemade bombs. Youthful idealism soon becomes an excuse for all-out anarchy.

Cast 

 Lyon Sim as Poe
 Aaron Samuel Yong as Laer
 Tanya Graham as Belle
 Jae Leung as CK
 Farid Assalam as Taurus
 Jade Griffin as Chloe
 Kris Moller as The Principal
 Jordan Prainito as Anthony
 Roshan Gidwani as AJ

Production 
Faeryville is a co-production between INRI studio and Film Mall. In August 2012, it was revealed that Tzang Merwyn Tong had finished principal photography for a secret film project that was in development since 2008. The film was code-named The FRVL Project, and was pitched as a controversial Fight Club meets Baz Luhrmann's Romeo & Juliet rebellion film. The film is written by Tzang in 2006 and is said to be inspired by youth of the post-9-11 generation.

The film ran out of money to complete production twice, and was shot over 2 production timelines, due to bad weather that almost bankrupted the indie project. The film took 8 years, 14 script rewrites to complete.

Release and reception
The film made its world premiere to stunning acclaim and reception in Los Angeles on January 14, 2015, represented by US-based distribution company Eleven Arts. Faeryville then opened on May 26, 2015 at Filmgarde Bugis+ with a limited theatrical run in Singapore.

Power of Pop hailed the film as "brave and remarkable" calling it "a fairytale of nightmarish consequences." Screen Anarchy, a website featuring news and reviews of mainly international, independent and cult films called Faeryville "A new cinematic universe... bleak, exciting, surprising.” 

Faeryville became the first Singapore film to compete at FLIXX Festival in Scott Valley. The film won the Best Original Story Award. Faeryville was also screened as part of the Singapore: Unbound - A Singapore Cinema Showcase at the Griffith Film School.

Soundtrack
Faeryville: Original Motion Picture Score consists of original, mostly orchestral music, with some electronic and guitar elements, written for the film by Alex Oh. Faeryville also features music by Singapore indie rock groups, including The Great Spy Experiment, post-rock band In Each Hand a Cutlass, Bob Kamal and ANECHOIS.

See also
 List of Singaporean films of 2015

References

External links 
 
 

2015 films
Singaporean fantasy films
2010s English-language films